was a Japanese samurai of the late Heian and early Kamakura periods. He was one of the closest retainers of Minamoto no Yoritomo, the first Kamakura shōgun, and was a personal tutor to the second, Minamoto no Yoriie.

Life 
The birth date of Shimokōbe Yukihira, a samurai of the late Heian and early Kamakura periods, is unknown. His clan were descendants of Fujiwara no Hidesato.

He was initially a vassal of the Taira clan, but when Prince Mochihito and Minamoto no Yorimasa had their call to arms, it was Yukihira who brought the word to his lord Minamoto no Yoritomo, and he joined Yoritomo when he called his banners. It was during Yoritomo's retreat to Awa Province following the Battle of Ishibashiyama that Yukihira added his forces to Yoritomo's. He was a trusted retainer of Yoritomo, and in Yōwa 1 (1181) was selected as one of his personal bodyguards (寝所近辺祗候衆). He was a prominent gokenin.

He reputedly had tremendous martial skill, particularly with the bow, demonstrating his skill frequently in yabusame, yumi-hajime (弓始) and deer-hunting. He later taught archery to Minamoto no Yoriie.

In Kenkyū 6 (1195) he was accepted as a member of Yoritomo's household (ja), but his activities in the Hatakeyama Shigetada incident (ja) and later are uncertain. The date of his death is unknown.

References

Citations

Works cited 

 
 
 
 

Year of birth unknown
Year of death unknown
12th-century Japanese people
Samurai
People of Heian-period Japan
People of the Genpei War
People of Kamakura-period Japan